The Boreads are the "wind brothers" in Greek mythology. They consist of Zetes (also Zethes) and Calaïs. Their place of origin was Thrace, home of their father Boreas (North wind).

Description 
Zetes and Calais were credited with very delicate and graceful hair, which was said to give them the ability to fly. They had great pride in who had the longest curls between the two of them and by boasting about these locks, they were uplifted. They had dusky wings which gleamed with golden scales.

Family 
The Boreads were the sons of Boreas and Oreithyia, daughter of King Erechtheus of Athens. They were the brothers of Chione and Cleopatra, wife of Phineus.

Mythology

Due to being sons of the north wind they were supernaturally gifted in different ways (depending on changes in the story from being passed down through generations and cultures) either being as fast as the wind or able to fly, having wings either on their feet or backs, depending on the myth. According to Ovid's Metamorphoses, their divine status showed in manhood when they sprouted wings on their backs.

They were Argonauts and played a particularly vital role in the rescue of Phineus from the harpies. They succeeded in driving the monsters away but did not kill them, at a request from the goddess of the rainbow, Iris, who promised that Phineas would not be bothered by the harpies again. As thanks, Phineas told the Argonauts how to pass the Symplegades. It is said that the Boreads were turned back by Iris at the Strophades. The islands' name, meaning "Islands of Turning", refers to this event.

Calais in one tradition is said to be the beloved of Orpheus; Orpheus was said to have been killed at the hands of jealous Thracian women whilst he wandered the countryside thinking of Calais.

Their death was said to be caused by Heracles on Tenos in revenge for when they convinced the Argonauts to leave him behind as he searched for Hylas.

Other sources imply that the sons of Boreas died chasing the harpies, as it was fated that they would perish if they failed to catch those they pursued. In some versions, the harpies drop into the sea from exhaustion and so their pursuers fall as well.

According to a rare variant of the myth by Tzetzes, the old man Phineus who was blind because of old age had two daughters named Eraseia and Harpyreia. These two lived in a very libertine and lazy life which was all wasted. Ultimately, the sisters abandoned themselves into poverty and fatal famine and were eventually snatched away by Zetes and Calais, disappearing from those places ever since.

Popular culture
The Boreads appear in The Heroes of Olympus series by Rick Riordan, where they reside in Quebec City with their sister Khione and their father Boreas. After their death, their father Boreas transformed them into immortal demigods to act as his lieutenants. In the novels, Calais (referred to as "Cal") struggles with words that have more than two syllables, including his own name. He has an obsession with ice hockey and pizza. Zetes is by far the more intelligent of the two, though he has his own quirks as well. He is metrosexual and tries to woo the character Piper McLean each time he encounters her. Both Boreads are teenaged, with purple wings and silvery hair; possess a deep-seated respect for anyone named Jason (because of their role as Argonauts); and carry jagged bronze swords. The two assist their sister Khione in her bid for power, but do not ultimately ally themselves with Gaea.

See also
 Corpus vasorum antiquorum

Notes

References 

 Apollodorus, Bibliotheke I, ix, 21; III, xv, 2.
Apollodorus, The Library with an English Translation by Sir James George Frazer, F.B.A., F.R.S. in 2 Volumes, Cambridge, MA, Harvard University Press; London, William Heinemann Ltd. 1921. ISBN 0-674-99135-4. Online version at the Perseus Digital Library. Greek text available from the same website.
Tzetzes, John, Book of Histories, Book I translated by Ana Untila from the original Greek of T. Kiessling's edition of 1826. Online version at theio.com

Argonauts
Demigods in classical mythology
Characters in the Argonautica
Thracian characters in Greek mythology
Sibling duos
Avian humanoids